Janów  is a village in Sokółka County, Podlaskie Voivodeship, in north-eastern Poland. It is the seat of the gmina (administrative district) called Gmina Janów.

References

Villages in Sokółka County
Trakai Voivodeship
Sokolsky Uyezd
Białystok Voivodeship (1919–1939)
Belastok Region